Nicholas Hugh Sebag-Montefiore (born 5 March 1955) is a British writer. He trained as a barrister before becoming a journalist and then a non-fiction writer. His second book Dunkirk: Fight to the Last Man was published in 2006. His previous book is Enigma: The Battle for the Code, the story of breaking the German Enigma machine code at Bletchley Park during the Second World War (Weidenfeld & Nicolson, 2000). His family owned Bletchley Park until they sold it to the British government in 1938.

In 2016, Somme: Into the Breach appeared in time for the 100th anniversary of the Somme Offensive. Cecil Sebag-Montefiore, the author's great-grandfather, killed himself after serving with the Royal Engineers on the Western Front.

He has been married since 1989 to Aviva Burnstock, the head of the Department of Art Conservation & Technology at the Courtauld Institute in London. His brother Simon Sebag Montefiore is also a writer, besides being an historian. His cousin Denzil was a platoon commander at Dunkirk.

Family history
Montefiore's father, Stephen Eric Sebag-Montefiore, was descended from a line of wealthy Sephardic Jews who were diplomats and bankers all over Europe. At the start of the 19th century, his great-great uncle, Sir Moses Montefiore, became a banking partner of N M Rothschild & Sons. His mother, Phyllis April Jaffé, comes from a Lithuanian Jewish family of poor scholars. Her parents fled the Russian Empire at the turn of the 20th century; they bought tickets for New York City, but were cheated, being instead dropped off at Cork, Ireland. During the Limerick Pogrom of 1904 they left Ireland and moved to Newcastle, England. The father of his namesake, Bishop of Birmingham Hugh Montefiore, was the great-great-nephew of Sir Moses.

References

Bibliography
Dunkirk: Fight to the Last Man 
Somme: Into the Breach Belknap Press, 2016 )

External links
 
Hugh Sebag-Montefiore on The Guardian
Hugh Sebag-Montefiore  on Penguin Books

Hugh
1955 births
Living people
British non-fiction writers
British Jewish writers
British Sephardi Jews
British male writers
People educated at Harrow School
Alumni of Magdalene College, Cambridge
Male non-fiction writers